Galiciotyphlotes weberi is a species of beetle in the family Carabidae, the only species in the genus Galiciotyphlotes.

References

Platyninae